Ronwen Hayden Williams (born 21 January 1992) is a South African professional soccer player who plays as a  goalkeeper for  Premier Soccer League club  Mamelodi Sundowns and captains the South Africa national team.

Club career

Early career 
Williams spent part of his youth career with Premier League club Tottenham Hotspurs.

SuperSport United 
Williams joined SuperSport United as a youth player in 2004. He made his debut in the CAF Champions League in January 2012 against Matlama FC, and in the PSL was four months later against Free State Stars. He kept clean sheets in both games.

Mamelodi Sundowns 
On 21 July 2022, Williams signed with Mamelodi Sundowns after a 12 year career at SuperSport United. He made his debut in the 2022/23 opener against Cape Town City FC where he made a string of great saves and keeping a clean sheet.

International career
Williams made his first match for South Africa on 5 March 2014, in a friendly against Brazil, due to a sprained ankle suffered by the first-choice keeper, Itumeleng Khune.
In August 2021, new Bafana coach Hugo Broos named Williams as the new Bafana Bafana captain, taking the armband from Thulani Hlatshwayo who failed to make the squad.

Career statistics

International

Honours

Club
Supersport United
 Nedbank Cup: 2015, 2016
 MTN 8: 2017

References

Living people
1992 births
Association football goalkeepers
Sportspeople from Port Elizabeth
South African soccer players
Cape Coloureds
SuperSport United F.C. players
Mamelodi Sundowns F.C. players
South Africa international soccer players
2019 Africa Cup of Nations players
Footballers at the 2020 Summer Olympics
Olympic soccer players of South Africa
Soccer players from the Eastern Cape